This is a list of the 50 largest islands in the North Sea.

See also
 List of islands of the British Isles
 List of islands of Denmark
 List of islands of Germany
 List of islands of the Netherlands
 List of islands of Norway

North Sea

Islands
North Sea